Jellicle cats are a fictional type of feline from T. S. Eliot's 1939 light poetry book Old Possum's Book of Practical Cats.

Jellicle cats were first mentioned in Eliot's 1933 poem "Five-Finger Exercises" and later developed in Old Possum's Book of Practical Cats. They were given further characterization in Andrew Lloyd Webber's 1981 stage musical Cats, which was based on Eliot's book. The large cast of diverse cats is an important part of the worldbuilding of Cats. Many of these characters originated from Eliot's book, while others are named after characters from other works by Eliot or were invented for the musical.

Background 
"Jellicle cats" are briefly mentioned in T. S. Eliot's 1933 poem "Five-Finger Exercises", although they are not described until Eliot's poem "The Song of the Jellicles", where Jellicle cats were depicted as commonly nocturnal black and white, scruffy cats. Specifically, Eliot mentions that they like to gather at an event called the "Jellicle Ball". The name "Jellicle" comes from an unpublished poem by Eliot entitled "Pollicle Dogs and Jellicle Cats", where "Pollicle dogs" is a corruption of "poor little dogs" and "Jellicle cats" of "dear little cats".

In contrast with their original poem, the Jellicles in Cats possess many kinds of coat-patterns, diverse personalities and individual talents. Many of the ensemble characters were created by the original 1981 London cast through extensive improvisation sessions held during the rehearsal process. Musical theatre scholar Vagelis Siropoulos noted that the level of detail given to each character was crucial in fleshing out the fantasy world of Cats, with even the minor cats having established personalities, relationships and hierarchies within the tribe. In the musical, sub-plots involving individual Jellicle cats include the struggle of Grizabella, a former "glamour cat", and the kidnapping of the Jellicle patriarch, Old Deuteronomy.

A total of 54 cat names are given in Old Possum's Book of Practical Cats, most of which Eliot derived from British culture, including references to Anglican traditions, historic and literary figures, as well as geographical locations. When not taken from a corresponding eponymous poem, many of the character names from the musical are taken from Eliot's poem "The Naming of Cats".

In popular culture
Although originally published as part of a collection of poems, "The Song of the Jellicles" was published by Faber and Faber in 2017 as a standalone picture book titled Jellicle Cats. Madame Tussauds New York features wax figures of a few of the Jellicle cats from the musical, including one of Grizabella that sings "Memory".

In Season 1 Episode 35 of Dungeons and Daddies, titled "The Jellicle  Ball",  the Daddies play a game of "Throw ball, catch ball, take it to the end of the field" with a team of Jellicle cats. 

In season 1, episode 2 of Bojack Horseman titled “Bojack Hates the Troops”, jellicles are mentioned in a song when the character Princess Carolyn, who is an anthropomorphic cat, makes Bojack hold while calling him.

In the 1976 film Logan's Run, the old man at the end offers Logan to trade one of his Jellicle cats to Logan.

References

Citations

Bibliography

 
 
 

Literary characters introduced in 1939
Anthropomorphic cats
 
T. S. Eliot